A by-election was held for the Australian House of Representatives seat of Gwydir on 15 April 1989. This was triggered by the resignation of National Party MP Ralph Hunt.

The Australian Labor Party did not field a candidate. The by-election was won by the National Party's John Anderson.

Candidates

National Party of Australia – John Anderson, farmer and grazier.
Independent – Bevan O'Regan. O'Regan had contested New England at the 1987 election as an independent National candidate, supporting the Joh for Canberra campaign. He later contested the Senate in 1996 for Australians Against Further Immigration and in 1998 for One Nation.
Independent – John Uebergang. Uebergang later contested the Senate in the 1993 election for the Confederate Action Party.

Results

See also
 List of Australian federal by-elections

Notes

References

1989 elections in Australia
New South Wales federal by-elections